The 1982 Segunda División de Chile was the 31st season of the Segunda División de Chile.

Arturo Fernández Vial was the tournament's champion.

Table

See also
Chilean football league system

References

External links
 RSSSF 1982

Segunda División de Chile (1952–1995) seasons
Primera B
1982 in South American football leagues